Ishimbay is a town in the Republic of Bashkortostan, Russia, located on the banks of the Belaya and Tayruk Rivers,  south of Ufa. Population:

Administrative and municipal status
Within the framework of administrative divisions, Ishimbay serves as the administrative center of Ishimbaysky District, even though it is not a part of it. As an administrative division, it is incorporated separately as the town of republic significance of Ishimbay—an administrative unit with the status equal to that of the districts. As a municipal division, the town of republic significance of Ishimbay is incorporated within Ishimbaysky Municipal District as Ishimbay Urban Settlement.

Climate

Demographics
Ethnic composition:
Russians: 51.7% (34 080)
Bashkirs: 28.4% (18 990)
Tatars: 14.9% (8976)
others: 5% (3315)

Economy
Bashneft has one of its offices located in Ishimbay.

Industrial production is represented by factories producing tracked articulated, all-terrain carrier (engineering company "Vityaz"), drilling equipment (Ishimbayskiy Machine Works), remote manipulators (INMAN, belongs Palfinger).

References

Notes

Sources

External links

Official website of Ishimbay 
Ishimbay Business Directory 

 
Ufa Governorate
Cities and towns in Bashkortostan